Wrapped Around Chicago - New Year's Eve at the Riviera is the second DVD release from progressive rock band Umphrey's McGee. It features excerpts from the group's New Year's Eve 2004 two-night stand at the Riviera Theater in their homebase of Chicago, Illinois. Most of the material comes from the December 31 show, some of which features a horn section on several tracks.

The initial print run was recalled when Jake Cinninger discovered sound issues with the disc, and a second print run was unveiled in late 2005.

The DVD includes extensive bonus features.

Track listing

Disc One
Divisions 
Great American 
Sociable Jimmy 
Prowler 
Jimmy Stewart 
Anchor Drops 
2nd Self 
The Crooked One 
Nopener 
Robot World
Partyin’ Peeps

Disc Two
Ophelia 
Mail Package 
Nopener (lounge version) 
Miss Tinkles Overture 
Mulche's Odyssey 
Sledgehammer 
Women, Wine and Song 
Slacker 
Bright Lights, Big City 
Auld Lang Syne 
Plunger 
Push the Pig 
Ringo 
In the Kitchen

Bonus Features
Bad is Bad (w/ Huey Lewis)
Nemo 
Padgett’s Profile 
Wife Soup 
Kabump

Personnel
Brendan Bayliss: guitar, vocals
Jake Cinninger: guitar, vocals
Joel Cummins: keyboards
Ryan Stasik: bass
Kris Myers: drums
Andy Farag: percussion

2005 video albums
2005 live albums
Umphrey's McGee video albums
Live video albums